Sart-Dames-Avelines is a village of Wallonia and a district of the municipality of Villers-la-Ville, located in the south of the province of Walloon Brabant, Belgium.

Notes

References

External links 
 
  — Etymology of the names of villages and place-names in Villers-la-Ville

Former municipalities of Walloon Brabant
Sub-municipalities of Villers-la-Ville